Sosnovoborsk is a town in Krasnoyarsk Krai, Russia, located on the right bank of the Yenisei River,  northeast of Krasnoyarsk. Sosnovoborsk is the quickest growing town in Krasnoyarsk region and is a part of Krasnoyarsk metro area.

History
It was founded in 1971 as a working settlement in connection with the construction of the Krasnoyarsk plant of automobile and tractor trailers and semi-trailers. Since 1973 it has been called Sosnovoborsk; The name is motivated by the pine forests (Russian: Sosnovy bor) surrounding the village. For some time it was part of the Leninsky district of the city of Krasnoyarsk.  It was granted town status in 1985.

In 1970, the government decided to build the largest trailer plant for KamAZ vehicles in the Krasnoyarsk region. At the same time, the construction of Sosnovoborsk began. The first director of the plant was Yuri Ivanovich Matveev, who later became the first honorary citizen of the city. Currently, the city has little developed infrastructure, as the city continues to be built.

Population 

As of January 1, 2022, in terms of population, the city was in 369th place out of 1117cities of the Russian Federation.

The demographic situation in the city is characterized by an intensive population growth. For the intercensal period 2002-2010. the number of city residents increased by +8.2%. In terms of population growth, Sosnovoborsk overtook Krasnoyarsk at that time, where the growth was + 7.2% . From 2010 to 2020, the population grew by 22.7%.

Transportation 
In Sosnovoborsk there are intercity buses No. 1, 2 and 3. Bus number 1 appeared in the city on March 29, 2013. Bus number 2 appeared in the city on October 31, 2014. Bus number 3 appeared in the city on January 1, 2020. The fare for a city bus is 22 rubles.

Sosnovoborsk is connected by bus routes with Krasnoyarsk and Zheleznogorsk, as well as with the village of Podgorny. A significant part of the inhabitants of Sosnovoborsk works in the regional center (Krasnoyarsk), making daily morning and evening commute.

The immediate plans include the commissioning of the movement of electric trains along the railway track of the Zheleznogorsk Mining and Chemical Combine from the railway station of Krasnoyarsk through Sosnovoborsk to Zheleznogorsk.

Interchange at the entrance to the city 
For a long time, entry into Sosnovoborsk was possible only through a railway crossing in the northern part of the city, which caused a lot of problems due to insufficient capacity, leading to congestion. In this regard, it was decided to build a new entrance to the city in the form of a two-level interchange. Construction began in September 2009. The opening took place on November 23, 2010. The Krasnoyarsk-Zheleznogorsk road in this section has been expanded to four lanes. The interchange does not have an exit from the city in the direction of Zheleznogorsk - it is possible to go there through a saved crossing. The entrance to Sosnovoborsk became seven kilometers closer to Krasnoyarsk.

Social sphere 
There are five secondary schools in the city, a house for children's creativity, a children's art school, an automechanical technical school, preschool institutions, a children's and youth sports school, the Torpedo stadium, the "Dream" House of Culture, a leisure center, the editorial office of the "Rabochiy" newspaper, and  "Pyaterochka”, “Commander”, “Krasny Yar”  chains of stores.

Sports complex "Nadezhda", "Coliseum", Ski lodge "Snezhinka". The Krasnoyarsk Regional Fund “Krasnoyarsk without orphans” is actively working on the territory.

References 

Cities and towns in Krasnoyarsk Krai
Cities and towns built in the Soviet Union
Populated places established in 1971
1971 establishments in the Soviet Union
Populated places on the Yenisei River